The Manteño-Huancavilca civilization were one of the last pre-Columbian civilization in modern-day Ecuador, active from 850 to 1600 CE (1150–400 BP).  It encompasses the area of the earlier Valdivia culture.

Scope
The term was coined in the mid-20th century by Ecuadorian archeologist , to describe pre-Hispanic settlement near the town of Manta on the Pacific coast. Their historic area has been engulfed in part by more recent settlement.  

Soon after  published his findings, the term Manteño began to be applied to several distinct sub-groups: northern Manteño (or ), southern Manteño and Punáe. Some archaeologists and historians reject this split, however, applying the term  to all three groups; this term is of Incan origin, from the time of the first colonisation. 

Little work has distinguished such groupings. Historian  Cieza de León, however, says that residents in coastal towns north of Salango used a type of facial tattoo distinguishable from those to their south. Other proposed divisions have included coastal and inland areas, based on types of burial and subsistence.

The Manteño chiefdoms – under the broad definition – extended over coastal parts of the present-day provinces of Manabí, Santa Elena and Guayas, including La Plata Island. The Bahía de Caráquez and Chone River mark the northern boundary of this territory, and the Guayas basin its southern boundary.

According to early colonial sources, the town of Picoazá was the site of a Manteño chiefdom. In addition, major sites have been found at the Cerro de Hojas and Cerro Jaboncillo, the Cerro de Paco, Cerro las Negras, Cerro los Santo, Bellavista, Agua Blanca, Loma de los Cangrejitos, López Viejo, Los Frailes, Montecristi, Olón, Salango and La Libertad.

Organisation
Many (if not all) were split into four major settlements, with the chief of the principal settlement overlord. Caamaño believed that the Manteños operated like a trading ring rather than a kingdom or empire, and drew parallels to the Hanseatic League. Manteño settlements typically contain large quantities of characteristic pottery and large stone foundations.

Lifestyle
The civilization primarily grew fruits and vegetables, such as maize, peanuts, tomatoes, and squash. The civilizations built their houses out of straw or palm leaves, and also used houses made of a type of bamboo native to the region, using river rocks as a foundation. The culture was also specialized in diving for Spondylus, a food that was said to be of the gods. They also used its purple and orange shell as a type of currency; this shell was traded throughout the region as far north as Mexico. The Spondylus is unique to the warm waters of coastal Ecuador. The Manteños were such a unique culture that the Inca never conquered them and let the Manteños buy their way with the food and shell of the gods that they only knew how to find due to this specialization of diving. (current archaeology grad student on current Manteño dig site in Manabí, Ecuador).

See also
List of pre-Columbian cultures

References

History of Ecuador
Pre-Columbian cultures
Archaeology of Ecuador
Archaeological cultures of South America